Bobrovka is a rural locality (a selo) and the administrative center of Bobrovsky Selsoviet, Pervomaysky District, Altai Krai, Russia. The population was 3,251 as of 2013. There are 60 streets.

Geography 
Bobrovka is located 33 km south of Novoaltaysk (the district's administrative centre) by road. Lesnoy and Rasskazikha are the nearest rural localities.

References 

Rural localities in Pervomaysky District, Altai Krai